Irish Hearts is a 1927 American comedy film directed by Byron Haskin and written by C. Graham Baker and Bess Meredyth. The film stars May McAvoy, Jason Robards Sr., Warner Richmond, Kathleen Key, Walter Perry and Walter Rodgers. The film was released by Warner Bros. on May 21, 1927.

Plot

Cast

References

External links
 

1927 films
1920s English-language films
Silent American comedy films
1927 comedy films
Warner Bros. films
Films directed by Byron Haskin
American silent feature films
American black-and-white films
1920s American films